The molecular formula C6H9N3O3 (molar mass: 171.15 g/mol, exact mass: 171.0644 u) may refer to:
 
 6-Diazo-5-oxo-L-norleucine (DON)
 Metronidazole

Molecular formulas